41 Signal Regiment (41 Sig Regt) is a reserve communications unit of the Royal Canadian Corps of Signals. It is part of 41 Canadian Brigade Group (41 CBG) in Alberta. The unit consists of:
 Regimental Headquarters (RHQ) in Edmonton
 Headquarters Squadron (HQ Sqn) in all three locations
 1 Squadron (1 Sqn) in Edmonton
 2 Squadron (2 Sqn) in Red Deer
 3 Squadron (3 Sqn) in Calgary

History
The regiment was created on 26 July 2011 by amalgamating the three independent communication squadrons in Alberta.

Cadets
There are several Royal Canadian Army Cadets units spread across Alberta which are affiliated to 41 Signal Regiment.

Cadet units affiliated to signal regiments receive support and also are entitled to wear traditional signals accoutrements on their uniforms.

References

External links

Calgary Sun "Demonstration at Military Museums Chance To Signal Your Interest In Forces" Sept 27, 2014"
41 Signal Regiment unofficial website

Military communications regiments of Canada
Organizations based in Edmonton
Organizations based in Calgary
Red Deer, Alberta
Military units and formations of Alberta
Military units and formations established in 2012
2012 establishments in Alberta